Varicellaria hemisphaerica is a species of crustose lichen belonging to the family Varicellariaceae.

It has an almost cosmopolitan distribution.

References

Pertusariales
Lichen species
Lichens of Europe
Lichens described in 1815
Taxa named by Heinrich Gustav Flörke